Géza Titusz Tuli (January 4, 1888 in Budapest – January 30, 1966 in Budapest) was a Hungarian gymnast who competed in the 1912 Summer Olympics. He was part of the Hungarian team, which won the silver medal in the gymnastics men's team, European system event in 1912.

References

External links
profile
profile 

1888 births
1966 deaths
Gymnasts from Budapest
Hungarian male artistic gymnasts
Gymnasts at the 1912 Summer Olympics
Olympic gymnasts of Hungary
Olympic silver medalists for Hungary
Olympic medalists in gymnastics
Medalists at the 1912 Summer Olympics
20th-century Hungarian people